Sealdah Metro Station is an operational station on Line 2 of the Kolkata Metro, located in Sealdah, Kolkata. The underground station adjoins with the Sealdah railway station of the Indian Railways on its eastern side. The Sealdah Court is on the west side of the station, the Sealdah Flyover (Vidyapati Setu) is on the northern side of the station. There is a pedestrian subway linking the metro station with the railway station.

Inauguration
In March 2022, The Commissioner of Railway Safety gave his approval for the commencement of commercial operations at this station and the station was likely to be inaugurated on the occasion of Poila Baisakh on 15 April 2022.
However, the inauguration on the Poila Baisakh could not happen as some issues pointed out by the Commissioner of Railway Safety, were yet to be fixed. After missing a few deadlines, the Station was ultimately inaugurated by the Union Minister Smriti Irani on 11 July 2022, with the commercial run beginning on 14 July 2022.

The station

Structure

Layout

Connections

Rail 
It is directly connected to the Sealdah railway station.

Gallery
More photos on commons:Category:Sealdah_metro_station

See also
List of Kolkata Metro stations

References 

Kolkata Metro stations
Railway stations in Kolkata
Railway stations in India opened in 2022